These are the election results of the 1955 Malayan general election by federal constituency. These councillors representing their constituency from 1955 to 1959 in the Federal Legislative Council.

Perlis

Kedah

Kelantan

Trengganu

Penang-Province Wellesley

Perak

Pahang

Selangor

Negri Sembilan

Malacca

Johore

References 

General elections in Malaysia
1955 elections in Malaya
Election results in Malaysia